Alex Roberts (born 21 June 1983 in Stockton-on-Tees, County Durham, England) is an English cricketer.  Roberts is a right-handed batsman who bowls right-arm quick ( Swing ).He was unlucky not to get more game time at Essex as he was drafted in to cover for Ravi Bopara who was ever present in the England side at that point. He has carved out a fantastic club career in England, Australia and New Zealand as a genuine all rounder. He was educated at King's Manor School and  Teesside Tertiary College, Middlesbrough.

Roberts made a single List A appearance for the Yorkshire Cricket Board, against the Northamptonshire Cricket Board, in the first round of the 2003 Cheltenham & Gloucester Trophy, which was played in 2002.  In his only List A match, he scored a single run, and took one wicket at a cost of 22 runs.

Roberts made his debut for Cumberland in the 2007 Minor Counties Championship against Suffolk.  From 2007 to 2009, he represented Cumberland in eight Minor Counties Championship matches, the last of which came against Lincolnshire.  He also represented Cumberland in the MCCA Knockout Trophy.  His debut in that competition for the county came against Cheshire in 2009.  From 2009 to present, he has represented the county in six  Trophy matches.

Roberts played one Twenty20 match for Essex in the 2008 Twenty20 Cup, and then a Twenty20 match for Leicestershire in the 2009 Twenty20 Cup.

Roberts has played and coached in Western Australia the last three seasons and dominated local cricket finishing top of the run charts in two of those three seasons averaging 55 with bat and 19 with the ball and currently sits on 49 Career first grade Tons

References

1983 births
Living people
Cricketers from Stockton-on-Tees
English cricketers
Yorkshire Cricket Board cricketers
Cumberland cricketers
Essex cricketers
Leicestershire cricketers